Tailly may refer to the following places in France:

Tailly, Ardennes, a commune in the department of Ardennes
Tailly, Côte-d'Or, a commune in the department of Côte-d'Or
Tailly, Somme, a commune in the department of Somme